Benjamin E. Hermalin is an American economist and university administrator.  He holds professorships in the department of economics at the University of California, Berkeley and in Berkeley's Haas School of Business, where he is the Thomas & Alison Schneider Distinguished Professor of Finance. Since 2022, he has also been Berkeley's executive vice chancellor and provost.

Early life and education
Hermalin grew up in Ann Arbor, Michigan, where his father was a professor of sociology and demography and his mother was a fundraiser, both at the University of Michigan.  He attended public schools in Ann Arbor before matriculating at Princeton University, where he majored in economics and was a member of Phi Beta Kappa, graduating summa cum laude with an AB in 1984.  He continued his studies in economics as a doctoral candidate at the Massachusetts Institute of Technology, first as a NSF Graduate Research Fellow and then as a Sloan Foundation Fellow, receiving a PhD in 1988.

Career
Hermalin is a well-cited researcher, an expert in corporate governance and the study of organizations, especially as concerns leadership, industrial organization, and law and economics.  In 1988, Hermalin joined the faculty of the department of economics and the Haas School of Business at Berkeley. During his tenure at Berkeley he has been a visiting scholar, professor, and research fellow at a number of other institutions, including the Federal Reserve Bank of San Francisco, Yale University, the Massachusetts Institute of Technology, Cornell University, and the University of Oxford (Nuffield College).  Since 1998, he has been Professor of Economics at Berkeley and, since 2006, he has been the Thomas & Alison Schneider Distinguished Professor of Finance at Berkeley Haas.  His research and scholarship have been sponsored by the National Science Foundation and the Gordon and Betty Moore Foundation.

Hermalin has served on the editorial boards of the American Economic Review and the Journal of Economic Literature, and, from 2010 through 2015, he was co-editor of the RAND Journal. He has been a director of the National Bureau of Economic Research since 2014.

Berkeley Administration
Hermalin's role as an administrator at Berkeley began in the mid-1990s, and, in 1999, he was appointed Associate Dean of Academic Affairs & Chair of the Faculty at the Haas School, serving for three years.  In 2002, he was interim dean at Haas, and, from 2005 through 2008, he chaired Berkeley's department of economics. 

From 2009 to 2012, Hermalin served on the university's budget committee and, from 2014 through 2016, on the academic senate.  He was Berkeley's Vice Provost for the Faculty from 2016 until 2022, when we was appointed Executive Vice Chancellor and Provost.

References

Living people
University of California, Berkeley administrators
University of California, Berkeley College of Letters and Science faculty
21st-century American  economists
Princeton University alumni
Massachusetts Institute of Technology alumni
Year of birth missing (living people)